The 25th Infantry Division (25-ya Pekhotnaya Diviziya) was an infantry formation of the Russian Imperial Army. It was a part of the 3rd Army Corps.

Organization
1st Brigade
97th Infantry Regiment Livonia (headquarters Dvinsk)
98th Infantry Regiment Yuriev (headquarters Dvinsk)
2nd Brigade, (headquarters Dvinsk)
99th Infantry Regiment of Ivangorod (headquarters Dvinsk)
100th Infantry Regiment Ostrovsky (headquarters Dvinsk)
25th Artillery Brigade

Commanders
08/15/1863 - 1864 - Lieutenant General Babkin, Grigory Danilovich
until 05.25.1865 - Major General Likhutin, Mikhail Dorimedontovich
05.24.1865 - 02.19.1877 - Major General (from 08.30, 1865 Lieutenant General) Samsonov, Gavriil Petrovich
02/22/1877 - 04/05/1878 - Major General (from 01/01, 1878 Lieutenant General) Kuzmin, Ilya Alexandrovich
04/05/1878 - 01/23/1883 - Major General (from 08/30, 1881 Lieutenant General) Iolshin, Mikhail Alexandrovich
02/18/1883 - 03/16/1883 - Lieutenant General Trotsky, Vitaly Nikolaevich
03/22/1883 - 07/06/1885 - Lieutenant General Rerberg, Pyotr Fedorovich
хх.хх.1885 - 08.26.1888 - Lieutenant General Paul, Alexander Petrovich
09/29/1888 - 05/29/1891 - Lieutenant General Ofrosimov, Evfimy Yakovlevich
June 17, 1891 - March 31, 1896 - Lieutenant General Nikolay Turbin
04/08/1896 - 09/27/1901 - Major General (from 05/14/1896 Lieutenant General) Baron Osten-Drizen, Nikolai Fedorovich
13.10.1901 - 02.08.1906 - Lieutenant General Pnevsky, Vyacheslav Ivanovich
08/16/1906 - 11/07/1907 - major general (from 04/22/1907 lieutenant general) Pelzer, Ivan Karlovich
11/07/1907 - 05/02/1910 - Lieutenant General Muffel, Vladimir Nikolaevich
1910-1911: Pavel Savvich
1911-1914: Pavel Bulgakov
1915: Mikhail Sokovin

Chiefs of Staff
08/30/1863 - after 05/03/1865 - Colonel Afanasyev, Dmitry Fedorovich
1866 -? - Lieutenant Colonel Parfyonov, Alexander Demidovich
earlier 08.02.1869 - until 20.11.1870 - Colonel Dragat, Ludomir Iosifovich
earlier 03/15/1872 - 11/13/1877 - Colonel Myagkov, Ivan Vasilievich
12/14/1877 - 01/07/1886 - Colonel Sunnerberg, Georgy Fedorovich
02/07/1886 - 07/03/1889 - Colonel Parutsky, Vasily Ignatievich
07/14/1889 - 11/06/1896 - Colonel Nechaev, Nikolai Ivanovich
11.22.1896 - 02.24.1900 - Colonel Zegelov, Alexander Alexandrovich
04/05/1900 - 03.24.1904 - Colonel Borisov, Vyacheslav Evstafievich
03.24.1904 - 07.29.1904 - Colonel Kalachov, Nikolai Khristoforovich
09/28/1904 - 05/23/1905 - Colonel Genishta, Vladimir Ivanovich
09/03/1905 - 07/04/1914 - lieutenant colonel (from 04/22/1907 colonel) Sokalsky, Ivan Alekseevich
09.09.1914 - 06.08.1915 - Colonel Romanovsky, Ivan Pavlovich
08/15/1915 - 04/09/1916 - Colonel Plekhanov, Sergei Nikolaevich
11/27/1916 - 10/15/1917 - Lieutenant Colonel (from 12/06/1916 Colonel) Vitkovsky, Konstantin Konstantinovich
10/26/1917 - etc. Lieutenant Colonel Reut, Alexey Ivanovich

References

Infantry divisions of the Russian Empire
Military units and formations disestablished in 1918